The painted frieze at the Bodleian Library, in Oxford, United Kingdom, is a series of 202 portrait heads in what is now the Upper Reading Room. It was made in 1619, and the choice of worthies to include was advanced for its time, featuring Copernicus and Paracelsus as well as Protestant reformers. The portraits have been attributed to the London guild painter Thomas Knight; they were taken from at least ten different sources, according to current views.

The frieze was painted directly onto stonework (rather than by fresco technique), and its condition deteriorated despite restoration in the 18th century. It was plastered over in 1830, and rediscovered in 1949.

Background
What is now the Upper Reading Room, on the top storey of the Library, was referred to by contemporaries as the "gallery". It has been suggested therefore that the initial conception was similar to a long gallery. Nowell Myres pointed out in one of his articles on the frieze that such instructive decoration by portraits in a library or museum was well known from the Giovio Series. Precedents from England of the 16th century were portrait series of bishops of Chichester, and founders of Peterhouse, Cambridge. Earlier precedents included portrait series of various groups such as, above all, saints, the Ancestors of Christ in a Tree of Jesse or other arrangement, or the Kings of France sculpted on the facade of Notre Dame.  The Nine Worthies usually appeared in secular contexts.  The Nine Worthies of London, proposed in 1592, cannot be said to have caught on.  Later British examples include the Frieze of Parnassus (1864–72) at the base of the Albert Memorial in London, and the painted processional frieze of famous Scots in the entrance hall of the Scottish National Portrait Gallery (1898).

Portrait collections in books (the book of icones) became one of the recognised genres of collecting and collation for Renaissance humanists, along with the emblem book and album amicorum. The literary tradition of de viris illustribus found in this way its visual expression, typically known by the Italian term uomini illustri. The Bodleian heads, as in other places, served to join knowledge of the Christian and classical traditions.

Content and layout

The frieze was painted in 1619. Its content came from Thomas Bodley (who had died in 1613) and the direction of his book collecting; but also represented the views of Thomas James, the first librarian. Theologically it portrays the Church of England as a continuation of the Catholic dissidents John Wyclif, Jan Hus, Savonarola, and Erasmus. The Protestant Reformation is strongly represented, and John Rainolds, the learned Oxford conforming Puritan, is included.

The portrait heads are located high on the walls of the U-shaped floor, running above the windows, with paintings several feet apart spaced out by images mainly of books. There is a division by the topics on which the authors wrote, corresponding to the university disciplines of the time. The theological display is on the southern flank; the northern side's authors refer to the Faculty of Arts.

List of the heads
Thomas Hearne took detailed notes of the frieze in 1725. His list and copies of inscriptions were basic to the modern restoration; one head remains unidentified. Hearne listed 200 heads (the single woman being Sappho) where in fact there are 202. As found in Hearne the heads are:

Sources for the heads
The collection was eclectic in terms of its models, but four major sources in books for the iconography of the heads have been identified. Other books were involved, according to current scholarship, and accessible English portraits in some cases.

The Pourtraits et vies des hommes illustres (Paris 1584) of André Thévet was used for many of the Church Fathers and medieval theologians, and some of the classical authors. The Icones virorum illustrium series of volumes of 50 (Frankfurt, from 1598) of Jean-Jacques Boissard and Theodore de Bry supplied many models for the heads of humanists. The strongly Protestant collection of Jacobus Verheiden (The Hague 1602) was a source for many of the reformers, where the engraver was Hendrik Hondius I. Other classical authors and humanists were taken from the Opus chronographicum of Pieter van Opmeer (Antwerp 1611): its posthumous edition contained woodcut illustrations in the style of portrait medals.

The restorers of the 1950s used some other sources from the period, including Theodore Beza's Icones (Geneva 1580), and Enrico Bacco's Effigie di tutti i re che han dominato il reame di Naoli (Naples 1602) for the head of Alphonso of Aragon. The original source for the head of St. Ephrem is not known; as for other heads of Church Fathers, the restorers used the 1624 work of Raphael Custos, Patrologia, id est Descriptio S. Patrum Graecorum & Latinorum, qui in Augustana Bibliotheca visuntur.

Notes

Bodleian Library
Bodleian Library